Four ships of the Royal Navy have been named HMS Grenada (or Granada), after the island of Grenada:
 (or Granada) was a 12-gun bomb vessel of 279 tons (bm) launched at Rotherhithe on 26 June 1693. She was under the command of Captain Thomas Willshaw and participating in a bombardment of Le Havre on 16 July 1694 when a shell fired from the town exploded on her, "blowing her to pieces".
 was the French privateer schooner Harmonie, launched in 1800 and captured in 1803 that the inhabitants of Grenada donated to the Royal Navy in 1804; at the end of 1810 she was sold for breaking up.
 was the French 16-gun privateer Iéna, which  captured in the North Sea in 1807. The Royal Navy took her into service but it is not clear that she was ever commissioned; she was last listed in 1814.

See also

 (or HMS Grenada) was a 4-gun bomb vessel launched at Deptford in 1695, and broken up in May 1718.

Citations and references
Citations

References
 
 
 

Royal Navy ship names